

The Franco-British Aviation Model 290 was a French four-seat amphibian flying boat built by the Franco-British Aviation Company (FBA) as a replacement for the Model 17 in French naval service.

Development
The FBA Company was requested to design a successor to the Model 17 in the liaison and training role. The company used the experience gained in the Model 270 and 271 and produced the Model 290. The Model 290 was a biplane amphibian with a single radial engine driving a pusher propeller. It had room for four persons in the forward part of the hull. The Model 290 flew for the first time in April 1931 powered by a 300 hp (224 kW) Lorraine engine. A further example, the Model 291 was built with a Gnome-Rhône radial engine.

The French Navy was looking for a VIP transport and ordered eight aircraft based on the Model 291 and designated the Model 293 (with a Lorraine engine) and the Model 294 (with a Gnome-Rhône engine). The navy aircraft were used as executive transports and based at the major French naval air stations.

Variants
Model 290
Prototype with a 296hp (221kW) Lorraine 9Na radial engine, one built.
Model 291
Prototype with a 296hp (221kW) Gnome & Rhône 7Kb radial engine, one built.
Model 293
Production aircraft for the French Navy with a 296hp (221kW) Lorraine 9Na Algol radial engine, six built.
Model 294
Production aircraft for the French Navy with a 296hp (221kW) Gnome-Rhône 7Kb engine, two built.

Operators

French Navy

Specifications (Model 293)

See also

References

Bousquet, Gérard. French Flying Boats of WW II. Sandomierz, Poland: Stratus, 2013 
 The Illustrated Encyclopedia of Aircraft (Part Work 1982–1985), 1985, Orbis Publishing, p. 1633

1930s French military transport aircraft
FBA aircraft
Flying boats
Amphibious aircraft
Single-engined pusher aircraft
Biplanes
Aircraft first flown in 1931